Cape Vahsel is a headland forming the eastern tip of South Georgia. It was roughly charted by Captain James Cook in 1775, remapped by the Second German Antarctic Expedition under Wilhelm Filchner, 1911–12, and named for Captain Richard Vahsel, master of the expedition ship Deutschland.

References
 

Headlands of South Georgia